A by-election was held for the Australian House of Representatives seat of Kooyong on 2 April 1966, following the resignation of Liberal Party MP and former Prime Minister Sir Robert Menzies on 16 February 1966.

The by-election was won by Liberal candidate Andrew Peacock, although with a reduced majority.

Results

See also
 List of Australian federal by-elections

References

1966 elections in Australia
Victorian federal by-elections
1960s in Victoria (Australia)
April 1966 events in Australia